The Puerto Rican records in swimming are the fastest ever performances of swimmers from Puerto Rico, which are recognised and ratified by the Puerto Rican Swimming Federation: Federación Puertorriqueña de Natación (FPN).

All records were set in finals unless noted otherwise.

Long Course (50 m)

Men

Women

Mixed relay

Short Course (25 m)

Men

Women

Mixed relay

References
General
Puerto Rican Long Course Records 1 January 2023 updated
Puerto Rican Short Course Records 21 November 2022 updated
Specific

External links
FPN website 

Puerto Rico
Records
Swimming
Swimming